Butler Amusements is a company that supplies rides, games, food, and beverages to various state and local fairs on the west coast of the United States.

History
In 1960 George "Bud" Butler started collecting games and rides with his son Earl "Butch" Butler, in 1972 they owned 8 rides which increased to 13 by 1973. They owned 130 rides by 1996. On December 21, 2011 Earl "Butch" Butler died making Mick Brajevich the current CEO.

Incidents
On August 30, 2013 a 38-year-old employee working at the Evergreen State Fair in Monroe, Washington was arrested on an outstanding warrant for forgery.

References

Entertainment companies established in 1960
Fairfield, California
1960 establishments in California